Batabanó can refer to:

Batabanó, Cuba, a municipality in Cuba
Gulf of Batabanó, a bay in Cuba
Surgidero de Batabanó, a village in Cuba